Luna Leederville (formerly New Oxford Theatre, Nickelodeon, Olympia, Star Theatre and Luna Cinema) is a cinema complex located at the corner of Oxford and Vincent Streets in Leederville, a suburb of Perth, Western Australia.

History
The New Oxford Theatre was designed by architect Samuel B. Rosenthal and constructed by E.A. Allwood.  Rosenthal was a significant architect in Western Australia in the inter-war period, known primarily for his cinema designs. The New Oxford Theatre was opened in March 1927 by the Minister for Works, Mr. Alex C. McCallum, before a capacity audience of 1,286. The opening programme included vaudeville, music by the New Oxford Orchestra, a short play, some comedy, and a special appearance by Miss Australia, Beryl Mills. Its first managers were William Bellion and Mr Cunningham.  Silent movies were originally shown to the accompaniment of a piano or organ.  During a second anniversary screening in 1929, hundreds were turned away because there were no seats left. This was the first suburban theatre to install sound, which was installed in September 1929.

A 3,000 seat picture garden was opened on the southern corner of the same intersection in 1935, the largest of its kind at the time, and was named 'New Oxford Beautiful'.  As time went on, the gardens capacity shrunk to just under 2,000.  The theatre was then owned by the Ampol Oil Company and Ralph Stewart was the operator until August 1959. Evelyn and Bob Manorgan owned the theatre from 1959 to October 1966.  The picture gardens closed in 1964 and an Ampol service station was built on the site by the owners. After Ampol sold it, the theatre was closed for two months in 1966 and then re-opened as the 'Nickelodeon'. Then in 1972 it was renamed the 'Olympia' and for the next seven years showed mainly Greek and Italian films, reflecting the changing local community.

Cyril Watson was the next to take over the lease of the theatre in Oxford Street and together with partner Roger Hunt and his wife Christine, they upgraded the theatre. It then re-opened as the 'New Oxford' on 18 August 1979 showing family-type films. The response was not as good as expected and Watson tried 'R'-rated films to boost attendances. This had the desired effect and new fittings and carpets were purchased. A coffee bar was also opened upstairs. In 1981 a new roof was installed and a large 13-metre screen, new projection equipment and new seating were purchased. The coffee bar and upstairs lounge were turned into a small cinema, which seated around 150 people and it was named 'Star Theatre'.  In 1980, the cinema underwent a renovation and two years later, the lounge was converted into a second cinema. Watson began providing live music on Sunday afternoons and it was around that time that he was offered  The Gods Must Be Crazy which was not doing well in the eastern states but proved to be so successful, becoming the cinema's longest running film, showing at the theatre for three years. In the mid 1980s, the theatre, now fully refurbished, began to show other independent films and in both 1998 and 1999 it was named the best Indie-Urban Cinema in Australia by the Australian Independent Distributors Association.  The cinema was renamed the 'Luna Cinema' in the 1990s. In 1995 the theatre was converted into twin cinemas.  In 1996, a new picture garden opened at the rear of the adjoining shops at No 163-167 Oxford Street, which seated 200. The entrance was later relocated and became part of the main building. Luna Palace group took over in 1999 and another renovation was performed, with the cinema renamed 'Luna Leederville'.

In 2009 a documentary, ‘The New Oxford Project’, was produced by the Film and Television Institute of Western Australia (in conjunction with the Town of Vincent) delving into the history of the New Oxford Theatre, since its opening in 1927 through to present day and the impact it has had on culture and residents of Leederville.

In 2012, Luna Leederville  was valued at 7-7.5 million.

Architectural character
The Luna Leederville is a representative example of a suburban cinema in the Interwar Art Deco style. The two storey facade is embellished with stucco decoration. Its façade is styled in Art Deco rather than the moderne used in theatres of a similar period such as the Astor, Cygnet and Regal. The theatre dominates the intersection and anchors this corner. The original roofline has been raised and the original verandah has been replaced. The side and rear facades are functionalist in their character and the side façade contributes little to the streetscape.

Heritage value
The Luna Leederville was included on the Town of Vincent's Municipal Heritage Inventory in November 1995 and is listed in the Town's Town Planning Scheme  The building is not currently listed on the State Register of Heritage Places, but is recommended to be included on the register and is currently awaiting determination by the Heritage Council of Western Australia.

Further reading
 A Pictorial Guide to Identifying Australian Architecture: Styles and Terms from 1788 to the Present Apperly, R., Irving, R. and Reynolds (1989) North Ryde, Angus and Robertson
 Perth: A Cinema History Bell, M.D (1986) Sussex, The Book Guild Ltd
 Essays on Art and Architecture in Western Australia Geneve, V. `William Thomas Leighton: Cinema Architect of the 1930s` in Bromfield, D. (ed.) 1988,  University of Western Australia Press, Nedlands
 Pioneer Modernist architect, Geneve, V. 'Samuel Rosenthal (1888–1967)' in Art Deco Society Newsletter, March 1992

References

External links
 Official website

Heritage places in Perth, Western Australia
Cinemas in Perth, Western Australia
Art Deco architecture in Western Australia
Vincent Street, North Perth